GTS Celebrity Summit is a  owned and operated by Celebrity Cruises and as such one of the first cruise ships to be powered by more environmentally friendly gas turbines. Originally named  Summit, she was renamed with the "Celebrity" prefix in 2008.

Construction

She was built in 2001 by the Chantiers de l'Atlantique shipyard in St. Nazaire, France for Celebrity Cruises.

Design

Machinery

She is fitted with two General Electric LM2500+ gas turbines and is fitted with two Rolls-Royce Mermaid azimuthing electric pod propulsion units. These pods proved unreliable early in the ships career, however with upgrades and operational experience they are currently more reliable. She also has three bow thrusters.

Layout

As per the practice with the other ships of her class she included a remembrance in one of her restaurants to an historic early liner in the form of several panels and a bronze statue from the Compagnie Générale Transatlantique ship . The statue, which was named La Normandie, had been purchased by Celebrity Cruises from the Miami Beach based Fontainebleau Miami Beach Hotel. The statue has since been removed from the main dining room during the ship's refurbishment in March 2019.

In 2012 she was refitted at a cost of US$16 million which included the creation of extra cabins. This increased her double occupancy to 2,158 passengers and her gross tonnage to 90,940.

Celebrity Summit spent approximately three weeks in dry dock followed by time in the shipyard in March 2019 having all of her existing cabins and suites refurbished as well as the addition of 30 new cabins which will bring her total capacity to 2,218 (double occupancy).

Operation
In the summer of 2006 Summit arrived in Seward, Alaska with a humpback whale dead on her bow.

In March 2017, Celebrity Summit had an unscheduled dry dock because of a propulsion issue. One cruise was canceled and another one was shortened.

Celebrity Summit undertakes cruises from Bayonne, New Jersey or San Juan to destinations in the Caribbean.

See also

 Kate McCue, Captain of Celebrity Summit 2015–2018

References

Further reading

External links

 Official website

2001 ships
Ships built by Chantiers de l'Atlantique
Summit